Yaotzin Meza  (born February 4, 1981) is an American former mixed martial artist who is best known for competing in the bantamweight and featherweight divisions of the Ultimate Fighting Championship.

Background 

Meza went to Flagstaff High School where he participated in wrestling, achieving 3rd place at the Arizona state wrestling championships his senior year.

MMA career 
Meza turned pro on April 29, 2006, losing by submission to Kyle Brees at RITC 81. Meza lost his next two bouts both to Amos Sotelo. Meza then won his next 8 fights before losing to Stephane Vigneault at TKO 34.

Ultimate Fighting Championship 
Meza made his promotional debut at UFC on FX 6 filling in for the injured Hacran Dias against Chad Mendes. he lost via KO in the first round.

Meza made his second UFC appearance at bantamweight against TUF alum John Albert at UFC on Fox 8. After surviving a dangerous armbar early in the fight, Meza was able to submit Albert in the second round with a rear-naked choke.

Meza faced Chico Camus on January 25, 2014, at UFC on Fox 10. Originally, he lost the fight via unanimous decision (30–27, 29–28, 29–28) but the result was overturned after Camus failed a post fight drug test.

Meza faced Sergio Pettis on June 7, 2014, at UFC Fight Night 42. He lost the fight via unanimous decision.

Meza faced promotional newcomer Damian Stasiak in a featherweight bout on April 11, 2015, at UFC Fight Night 64. Meza won the back and forth fight by unanimous decision.

Meza faced Sam Sicilia on July 15, 2015, at UFC Fight Night 71, replacing Doo Ho Choi. He lost the fight by unanimous decision.

Meza faced Arnold Allen on February 27, 2016, at UFC Fight Night 84. He lost the fight by unanimous decision.

Post-UFC career and retirement
Over two years after getting cut from the UFC, Meza faced Gilberto Aguilar at Combate Americas 24 on September 15, 2018. Meza won the fight via rear-naked choke in the first round and retired from the sport.

Mixed martial arts record

|-
|Win
|align=center|22–11 (1)
|Gilberto Aguilar
|Submission (rear-naked choke)
|Combate Americas 24
|
|align=center|1
|align=center|3:58
|Phoenix, Arizona, United States
|
|-
|Loss
|align=center|21–11 (1)
|Arnold Allen
|Decision (unanimous)
|UFC Fight Night: Silva vs. Bisping
|
|align=center|3
|align=center|5:00
|London, England
| 
|-
|Loss
|align=center|21–10 (1)
|Sam Sicilia
|Decision (unanimous)
|UFC Fight Night: Mir vs. Duffee
|
|align=center|3
|align=center|5:00
|San Diego, California, United States
|
|-
|Win
|align=center|21–9 (1)
|Damian Stasiak
|Decision (unanimous)
|UFC Fight Night: Gonzaga vs. Cro Cop 2
|
|align=center|3
|align=center|5:00
|Kraków, Poland
|
|-
|Loss
|align=center|20–9 (1)
|Sergio Pettis
|Decision (unanimous)
|UFC Fight Night: Henderson vs. Khabilov
|
|align=center|3
|align=center|5:00
|Albuquerque, New Mexico, United States
|
|-
|NC
|align=center|20–8 (1)
|Chico Camus
|NC (overturned)
|UFC on Fox: Henderson vs. Thomson
|
|align=center|3
|align=center|5:00
|Chicago, Illinois, United States
|
|-
| Win
|align=center| 20–8
|John Albert
| Submission (rear-naked choke)
| UFC on Fox: Johnson vs. Moraga
|July 27, 2013
|align=center| 2
|align=center| 2:49
|Seattle, Washington, United States
|
|-
| Loss
|align=center| 19–8
|Chad Mendes
| KO (punches)
| UFC on FX: Sotiropoulos vs. Pearson
|December 15, 2012
|align=center| 1
|align=center| 1:55
|Gold Coast, Australia
|
|-
| Win
|align=center| 19–7
|Kevin Croom
| Decision (unanimous)
| RITC - Rage in the Cage 163
|October 20, 2012
|align=center| 3
|align=center| 5:00
|Chandler, Arizona, United States
|
|-
| Loss
|align=center| 18–7
|Andres Quintana
| TKO (punches)
| WMMA - Region 4 - Round 1
|April 14, 2012
|align=center| 1
|align=center| 2:43
|Prescott Valley, Arizona, United States
|
|-
| Win
|align=center| 18–6
|Ran Weathers
| Decision (unanimous)
| MBP - Sun City Battle 2
|October 1, 2011
|align=center| 3
|align=center| 5:00
|El Paso, Texas, United States
|
|-
| Win
|align=center| 17–6
|Eric Regan
| Submission (guillotine choke)
| RITC - Rage in the Cage 154
|September 9, 2011
|align=center| 2
|align=center| 0:58
|Chandler, Arizona, United States
|
|-
| Win
|align=center| 16–6
|Scott Pike
| TKO (punches)
| RITC - Rage in the Cage 151
|April 16, 2011
|align=center| 1
|align=center| 1:39
|Chandler, Arizona, United States
|
|-
| Win
|align=center| 15–6
|Nick Piedmont
| Decision (unanimous)
| DRFCF 8
|November 19, 2010
|align=center| 3
|align=center| 5:00
|Yuma, Arizona, United States
|
|-
| Win
|align=center| 14–6
|Brandon Shelton
| Submission (guillotine choke)
| C3 Fights - Slammin Jammin Weekend 6
|October 22, 2010
|align=center| 1
|align=center| 1:42
|Newkirk, Oklahoma, United States
|
|-
| Win
|align=center| 13–6
|Casey Milliken
| Decision (unanimous)
| RITC 143 - Rage in the Cage 143
|July 31, 2010
|align=center| 3
|align=center| 5:00
|Phoenix, Arizona, United States
|
|-
| Loss
|align=center| 12–6
|Rich Taylor
| Decision (unanimous)
| EB - Beatdown at 4 Bears 5
|October 24, 2009
|align=center| 3
|align=center| 5:00
|New Town, North Dakota, United States
|
|-
| Loss
|align=center| 12–5
|Jamie Schmidt
| Submission (armbar)
| AG - Extreme Beat Down
|April 11, 2009
|align=center| 1
|align=center| 1:59
|Phoenix, Arizona, United States
|
|-
| Win
|align=center| 12–4
|Travis Reddinger
| Submission (rear-naked choke)
| EB - Beatdown at 4 Bears 4
|March 21, 2009
|align=center| 1
|align=center| 1:40
|New Town, North Dakota, United States
|
|-
| Win
|align=center| 11–4
|Alonzo Martinez
| Submission (guillotine choke)
| EVO MMA - Evolution MMA
|October 4, 2008
|align=center| 2
|align=center| 2:08
|Phoenix, Arizona, United States
|
|-
| Win
|align=center| 10–4
|Antonio Lepe
| TKO (punches)
| MFC - Mexican Fighting Championship
|September 20, 2008
|align=center| 1
|align=center| 2:30
|Puerto Penasco, Mexico
|
|-
| Win
|align=center| 9–4
|Gabriel Benítez
| Decision (unanimous)
| NDG - Noche de Gladiadores
|August 15, 2008
|align=center| 3
|align=center| 3:00
|Hermosillo, Mexico
|
|-
| Loss
|align=center| 8–4
|Stephane Vigneault
| TKO (punches)
| TKO 34 - Sims vs. Bosse
|June 7, 2008
|align=center| 2
|align=center| 3:28
|Montreal, Quebec, Canada
|
|-
| Win
|align=center| 8–3
|Randy Steinke
| Submission (rear-naked choke)
| FMF - Full Moon Fighting
|February 23, 2008
|align=center| 3
|align=center| 1:27
|Sonora, Mexico
|
|-
| Win
|align=center| 7–3
|Hans Burnett
| TKO (punches)
| RITC 102 - Hodges vs. Schumacher
|October 13, 2007
|align=center| 1
|align=center| 2:56
|Tucson, Arizona, United States
|
|-
| Win
|align=center| 6–3
|Donny Walker
| TKO (punches)
| EC: Fights
|September 29, 2007
|align=center| 2
|align=center| N/A
|Monterrey, Mexico
|
|-
| Win
|align=center| 5–3
|Austin Pascucci
| Decision (unanimous)
|RITC 98 - Rage in the Cage 98
|July 21, 2007
|align=center|3
|align=center|3:00
| Fountain Hills, Arizona, United States
|
|-
| Win
|align=center| 4–3
|Pete Vandervort
| TKO (punches)
|WFC - Rumble In The Red Rocks
|June 9, 2007
|align=center|1
|align=center|2:25
|Camp Verde, Arizona, United States
|
|-
| Win
|align=center| 3–3
|Patrick Lopez
| Decision (split)
|RITC 91 - Rage in the Cage 91
|February 24, 2007
|align=center|3
|align=center|3:00
|Phoenix, Arizona, United States
|
|-
| Win
|align=center| 2–3
|Richie Reyes
| Submission (punches)
|RITC 88 - Veteran's Day Rumble
|November 11, 2006
|align=center|2
|align=center|1:29
|Tucson, Arizona, United States
|
|-
| Win
|align=center| 1–3
|Robert Maldonado
| Decision (unanimous)
|RITC 86 - Rage in the Cage
|August 15, 2006
|align=center|3
|align=center|3:00
|Tucson, Arizona, United States
|
|-
| Loss
|align=center| 0–3
|Amos Sotelo
| Submission (guillotine choke)
|RITC 84 - Celebrity Theatre
|July 1, 2006
|align=center|2
|align=center|1:55
|Fort McDowell, Arizona, United States
|
|-
| Loss
|align=center| 0–2
|Amos Sotelo
| Decision (unanimous)
|RITC 82 - More Rage
|May 26, 2006
|align=center|3
|align=center|3:00
|Tucson, Arizona, United States
|
|-
| Loss
|align=center| 0–1
|Kyle Brees
| Submission (triangle choke)
|RITC 81 - Rage in the Cage 81
|April 29, 2006
|align=center|1
|align=center|2:01
|Upland, California, United States
|
|-

See also
 List of current UFC fighters
 List of male mixed martial artists

References

External links
 
 

1981 births
Living people
Sportspeople from Santa Ana, California
American male mixed martial artists
Featherweight mixed martial artists
Bantamweight mixed martial artists
Mixed martial artists utilizing wrestling
American mixed martial artists of Mexican descent
Ultimate Fighting Championship male fighters
American male sport wrestlers